is a Nippon Professional Baseball pitcher for the Chiba Lotte Marines in Japan's Pacific League.

External links

1975 births
Chiba Lotte Marines players
Japanese baseball coaches
Japanese baseball players
Living people
Nippon Professional Baseball coaches
Nippon Professional Baseball pitchers
Baseball people from Shizuoka Prefecture